Awasi is a small town in Kisumu County, Kenya. It is a small center that has grown to become the headquarters of Nyando Sub-county in Kisumu County. The town  is also commonly known by the name "Ladhri", a Dholuo word meaning 'someone who always lacks' or 'someone begging for help/ looking to others for help'.

Awasi Town is strategically located in the border between Nyanza and Rift Valley provinces, hence the name Awasi Border. The town has recently grown substantially due to trade between the Luo and Kalenjin communities among other Kenyan tribes.

Investors have also been able to establish a presence in the town with various companies establishing a strong presence in the town. companies like Gogni Rajope, Steel Mills, among others have made entry in this small town. This shows how confident investors are regarding the town

The member of county assembly Awasi/Onjiko is Otieno Ngeta'.

References 

Populated places in Kenya
Kisumu County